Malatya Airport  is a military and public airport in Malatya, Turkey.

History
A new terminal is expected to open in 2023.

During the  2023 Turkey–Syria earthquake, the ceiling of the airport experienced a partial collapse.

2nd Land Aviation Regiment 
Next to Erhaç Airport is the 2nd Land Aviation Regiment Command, headed by a Colonel. Turkish-made TAI/AgustaWestland T129 ATAK combat helicopters joined the Command in 2014.

Airlines and destinations
The following airlines operate regular scheduled and charter flights at Malatya Erhaç Airport:

Traffic Statistics 

(*)Source: DHMI.gov.tr

References

External links
 
 
  Official Airport Website

Airports in Turkey
Turkish Air Force bases
Buildings and structures in Malatya Province
1941 establishments in Turkey
Airports established in 1941
Transport in Malatya Province
Military in Malatya
Buildings damaged by the 2023 Turkey–Syria earthquake